The Miss Earth Uganda is an annual beauty pageant in Uganda and was created in 2014. It is responsible for sending Uganda's representative to the Miss Earth pageant which is an annual international beauty pageant promoting environmental awareness. The current title holder (Miss Earth Uganda 2022) is Caroline Ngabire.

Overview
As published in their website, Miss Earth Uganda is a beauty pageant in search of the most beautiful young Ugandan lady who is very knowledgeable about her environment and who will strongly stand as an ambassador for the protection and preservation of the environment.

The pageant is making efforts to create awareness about environmental sustainability and decided focus on activities that highly promote the protection and preservation of the environment such as greening, recycling, tree planting, energy efficiency, ecotourism and carbon conscious lifestyle choices among others. Miss Earth Uganda works to combat the ill effects of global warming.

Due to Covid-19 restrictions, a national contest was not held but the 2021 representative was appointed by the National Director, Monica Akech, at a ceremony that was conducted as a hybrid of a virtual and physical pageant, held in Fort Portal City, Nyaika Hotel.

Miss Earth Uganda 2021 Ahlam Ismail Alibhai was officially crowned by the Queen Mother of Tooro Kingdom, HRH Dr. Best Kemigisia who was officially named as patron of Miss Earth Uganda.

History

2007-2008: Uganda's debut
Uganda debuted in 2002 through the Miss Uganda pageant. While Uganda came back in 2007, the pageant's first runner up, Hellen Karungi, competed in Miss Earth 2007. Victoria Nabagereka participated the following year. Both went unplaced as the pageant concluded.

After 2008, Uganda did not send a delegate to Miss Earth until 2015.

2014 - 2017: Uganda's comeback
The Miss Earth Uganda franchise was obtained by First Face Pageantry and Modeling Consultancy Ltd. and a national contest was held annually. Victoria Nabagereka, Miss Earth Uganda 2008, acted  as the national director for Uganda. 

2018- 2019

No Ugandan representation at Miss Earth. 

2020

At the first ever Miss Earth virtual pageant, Ugandan representative, Priscillah Mbabazi had no National Director.

2021 - present

The franchise was obtained by Afrost Uganda Marketing LTD, under the directorship of Monica Akech. The selected candidate, Ahlam Ismail Alibhai was appointed to represent the nation at Miss Earth which will be virtually held for the second year due to Covid-19 regulations.

Due to pandemic restrictions in Uganda, a national contest could not be held but was postponed to August 2022.

Selection process
Previous franchise holders organizers intended to start the selection process with 25 districts and since the pageant was district-based, they intended to closely work with local officials and council chairpersons, together with pageant delegates and MEU district delegates. “At district level, competitions will be carried out to ensure that each of the participating candidates are not only beautiful but also environmentally- informed,” Nabagereka said.

The evaluators will come from National Forestry Authority and National Environmental Management Authority (NEMA). According to Gilbert Kadilo, the communications and PR manager at NFA, the authority will provide technical advice and guidance. “This is a springboard and we expect this to translate into skills and hearts that will love and protect the environment,” he said.

With current management, as initiated by Akech Monica, only 15 girls will be selected from 15 districts across the 4 regions of Uganda via online web portal applications to compete at national level on a televised reality series, leading to a grand coronation event under the Uganda Pageant Girls mantle.

Titleholders 
This list includes all the representatives of Uganda, including the representatives sent by the previous license holders.

Representative for Miss Earth

References

Further reading
  NFA, NEMA organize Miss Earth Uganda 2015. New Vision.
  Miss Earth Uganda finale The Observer.
  Miss Earth Uganda Finale Set for September 5. All Africa.
 Pearl Asasira Is Miss Earth Uganda 2015. All Africa.
 Uganda: Miss Earth Uganda Finale Tomorrow. All Africa.
 Miss Earth Uganda Wins Gold. Uganda News.
 Miss Earth Uganda, Sandra Akello wins gold in Austria. Uganda 24/7 News.

External links
Official website

Beauty pageants in Uganda
Uganda
Recurring events established in 2014